Hewitsonia bitjeana is a butterfly in the family Lycaenidae. It is found in south-eastern Nigeria, southern Cameroon and possibly Gabon and the Republic of the Congo.

References

Butterflies described in 1915
Poritiinae